The following is an alphabetical list of topics related to the nation of Saint Lucia.

0–9 

.lc – Internet country code top-level domain for Saint Lucia

A
Airports in Saint Lucia
Americas
North America
North Atlantic Ocean
West Indies
Caribbean Sea
Antilles
Lesser Antilles
Islands of Saint Lucia
Anglo-America
Antilles
Army of Saint Lucia
Atlantic Ocean
Atlas of Saint Lucia

B
Beaches in Saint Lucia
Bibliography of Saint Lucia
Birds of Saint Lucia

C
Capital of Saint Lucia:  Castries
Caribbean
Caribbean Community (CARICOM)
Caribbean Sea
Castries – Capital of Saint Lucia
Categories:
:Category:Saint Lucia
:Category:Buildings and structures in Saint Lucia
:Category:Communications in Saint Lucia
:Category:Economy of Saint Lucia
:Category:Education in Saint Lucia
:Category:Environment of Saint Lucia
:Category:Fauna of Saint Lucia
:Category:Geography of Saint Lucia
:Category:Government of Saint Lucia
:Category:History of Saint Lucia
:Category:Military of Saint Lucia
:Category:Politics of Saint Lucia

:Category:Saint Lucia stubs
:Category:Saint Lucian culture
:Category:Saint Lucian people
:Category:Saint Lucia-related lists
:Category:Society of Saint Lucia
:Category:Sport in Saint Lucia
:Category:Transport in Saint Lucia
commons:Category:Saint Lucia
Cities of Saint Lucia
Climate of Saint Lucia
Coat of arms of Saint Lucia
Commonwealth of Nations
Commonwealth realm of Saint Lucia
Communications in Saint Lucia
Companies of Saint Lucia
Constitution of Saint Lucia
Culture of Saint Lucia

D
Demographics of Saint Lucia
Diplomatic missions in Saint Lucia
Diplomatic missions of Saint Lucia

E
Economy of Saint Lucia
Education in Saint Lucia
Elections in Saint Lucia
English colonization of the Americas
English language

F

Flag of Saint Lucia
Foreign relations of Saint Lucia

G
Geography of Saint Lucia
Government of Saint Lucia
Governors-General of Saint Lucia
Gross domestic product

H
Health in Saint Lucia
Healthcare in Saint Lucia
Hinduism in Saint Lucia
History of Saint Lucia
Hospitals in Saint Lucia

I
International Organization for Standardization (ISO)
ISO 3166-1 alpha-2 country code for Saint Lucia: LC
ISO 3166-1 alpha-3 country code for Saint Lucia: LCA
Internet in Saint Lucia
Islands of Saint Lucia:
Saint Lucia island
Bateaux Island
Bouche Island
Choc Island
Dennery Island
Des Bateaux Island
Fourer Island
Fous Island
Fregate Island (Saint Lucia)
Gros Island
Lapins Island
Maria Islands
Pigeon Island (Saint Lucia)
Praslin Island (Saint Lucia)
Rat Island (Saint Lucia)
Rouche Island
Scorpion Island (Saint Lucia)

L
Law enforcement in Saint Lucia
Lesser Antilles
LGBT rights in Saint Lucia (Gay rights)
Lists related to Saint Lucia:
List of airports in Saint Lucia
List of birds of Saint Lucia
List of cities in Saint Lucia
List of islands of Saint Lucia
List of mountains of Saint Lucia
List of rivers of Saint Lucia
List of volcanoes in Saint Lucia
List of countries by GDP (nominal)
List of Saint Lucians
List of political parties in Saint Lucia
Diplomatic missions of Saint Lucia
List of diplomatic missions in Saint Lucia
List of Governors-General of Saint Lucia
List of companies of Saint Lucia
List of Saint Lucia-related topics
List of World Heritage Sites in Saint Lucia
Topic outline of Saint Lucia

M
Military of Saint Lucia
Monarchy of Saint Lucia
Mountains of Saint Lucia
Music of Saint Lucia

N
National Emergency Management Organisation (NEMO)
North America
North Atlantic
Northern Hemisphere

O
Organisation of Eastern Caribbean States (OECS)

P
Parliament of Saint Lucia
People of Saint Lucia
Political parties in Saint Lucia
Politics of Saint Lucia
Prime Minister of Saint Lucia

R
Religion in Saint Lucia
Rivers of Saint Lucia

S
Saint Lucia
Saint Lucia Giant Rice-rat
Saint Lucia at the Olympics
The Saint Lucia Scout Association
Saint Lucia Solid Waste Management Authority (SLUSWMA)
Saint Lucian diplomatic missions
Scouting in Saint Lucia
Senate of Saint Lucia
Soufrière River
Sports in Saint Lucia
States headed by Elizabeth II

T
Topic outline of Saint Lucia
Tourism in Saint Lucia
Transport in Saint Lucia

U
United Nations, member state since 1979
United States-Saint Lucia relations

V
Visa free travel from Saint Lucia
Volcanoes of Saint Lucia

W
Western Hemisphere

Wikipedia:WikiProject Topic outline/Drafts/Topic outline of Saint Lucia
Windward Islands
World Heritage Sites in Saint Lucia

See also

Commonwealth of Nations
List of Caribbean-related topics
List of international rankings
Lists of country-related topics
Topic outline of geography
Topic outline of North America
Topic outline of Saint Lucia
United Nations

References

External links

 
Saint Lucia